René Bondoux (26 May 1905 – 6 May 2001) was a French fencer. He won a gold medal in the team foil event at the 1932 Summer Olympics and a silver in the same event at the 1936 Summer Olympics.

References

External links
 

1905 births
2001 deaths
French male foil fencers
Olympic fencers of France
Fencers at the 1932 Summer Olympics
Fencers at the 1936 Summer Olympics
Olympic gold medalists for France
Olympic silver medalists for France
Olympic medalists in fencing
Sportspeople from Aube
French military personnel of World War II
Recipients of the Croix de Guerre (France)
Recipients of the Olympic Order
Medalists at the 1932 Summer Olympics
Medalists at the 1936 Summer Olympics
20th-century French people